The Saudi Third Division , also known as the Saudi League 3rd Division, is a football league, the fourth tier of the Saudi Arabian football league system. Al-Suqoor defeated Al-Qous 2–1 to become the inaugural champions and are the current holders.

Creation of the competition
The Saudi FF created a new league called the Third Division League, consisting of 32 teams, and divided into four regional groups, starting from the 2021–22 season. Finally, at the level of local competitions affiliated with the Saudi Football Association, the federation announced the change of the third division to the fourth division league.

Promotion and relegation
The 4 group winners would get promoted to the Saudi Second Division. In addition, the 4 best runners-up would face each other in the promotion play-offs to earn promotion to the Second Division. The bottom 4 teams are relegated to the Fourth Division.

Club performances

The teams participating in the first edition

References

External links
 Saudi Arabia Football Federation

 
4
Fourth level football leagues in Asia